Dabbs is a surname. Notable people with the surname include:

Benjamin Dabbs (1909–2000), English footballer 
Ellen Lawson Dabbs (1853–1908), Texas physician and women's rights activist
Isaac Dabbs (date of birth and death unknown), Virginian politician
James M. Dabbs Jr. (1937–2004), American psychologist and professor
Matt Dabbs, English drummer
Sarah Mavis Dabbs (1922–2000), All-American Girls Professional Baseball League player
Trent Dabbs, American singer-songwriter

DABB, Dabb, or Dabbs may also refer to:

DABB, airport identifier code for Rabah Bitat Airport
Dabb Balouchan, a village in Punjab, Pakistan
Andrew Dabb (born ?), American writer
Dabbs Greer (1917–2007), American actor
 The Dabbs Store, a historical building in West Memphis, Arkansas
Uromastyx, commonly called as dabb lizard